The hourglass treefrog is a frog found in Belize, Colombia, Costa Rica, Ecuador, Guatemala, Honduras, Mexico, Nicaragua, and Panama.

Hourglass treefrog may also refer to:

 Common hourglass treefrog, a frog endemic to Sri Lanka
 False hourglass treefrog, a frog endemic to the southern Western Ghats, India
 Montane hourglass treefrog, a frog endemic to Sri Lanka